Austromitra gradusspira is a species of sea snail, a marine gastropod mollusk, in the family Costellariidae, the ribbed miters.

Distribution
This species occurs in South Africa (country).

References

gradusspira